The United Church of Canada uses a three-level model of governance, consisting of communities of faith; regional councils; and the General Council.

Governance structure

Communities of faith
There are currently just over 2,000 communities of faith, which are the basic unit of the United Church, consisting of one or more congregations under the spiritual leadership of a minister or ministry team. The community of faith is responsible for their day-to-day operations, including worship, programming, mission, building maintenance and finances, local committee work and projects. The community of faith, is also responsible for searching out and hiring church staff, including ministers, musicians and lay staff; maintenance and upkeep of their property and buildings; deciding when they worship, and how often; policies on candidacy for baptism and marriage (including, but not limited to whether the congregation will allow same-sex marriages to be performed in their building); Christian development and education within the congregation (Sunday School, youth and adult confirmation classes, Bible study, etc.); outreach projects to the community and wider world; and other day-to-day functions. Policy decisions at this level are usually made by a congregational Board or Council which can take one of several forms, as listed in the United Church policy and doctrine handbook, known as The Manual. Certain items, including budgets, major financial expenses, renovations, election of board members and changes to ministry personnel must be approved at a meeting of the full congregation. Other decisions must be approved by or made with the support of a Regional Council.

Regional councils
Communities of faith are grouped into sixteen regional councils, which are responsible for a variety of tasks, including the care and oversight of the communities of faith within it.

The regional councils draw their membership and leadership from their communities of faith, supported by paid resource staff — each community of faith, depending on its size, elects between 1-4 of its members to serve on the regional council. In addition to these lay members, all ministers, both active and retired, within the area of the regional council are also members of the United Church through the regional council. (This is unlike some other denominations where the clergy's membership resides within a local congregation or community of faith.) If needed, the regional council can also seek out other members of the wider church to sit on committees and task groups in order to better represent the diversity, skill and gifts of the entire United Church.

Regional councils are responsible for a variety of tasks within the wider church, including recognizing, supporting and living in covenantal relationship with ministry students, candidates and other personnel; supporting, servicing and overseeing the work of communities of faith; engaging in local, national and global initiatives and partnerships for mission, ministry, ecumenism and justice; implementing and setting policy; and, along with the General Council, working towards joining the church's "collective hearts, voices, and resources to witness to the gospel and vision of Jesus for a compassionate and just society, both in Canada and around the world."

General Council 
General Council has 260 members: 
 the current Moderator (the spiritual head of the church, elected at the first meeting of the current General Council)
 the immediate past Moderator 
 the General Secretary
 the leaders of the sixteen regional councils and 204 members elected by the regional councils 
 fifteen members chosen by the National Indigenous Organization
 the Executive of the General Council
The Executive then elects enough members to bring the total number to 260, choosing members who will ensure diversity in gender, age, racial and cultural identities and sexual expressions.

The term of service on General Council is three years. At the start of their term, all members meet in person to   
 set denominational policy and doctrine; 
 debate and discuss proposals and other work which appropriately comes before the highest council of the church; 
 and elect a new Moderator

Following their first meeting, the members of the General Council then meet annually, either through electronic means or in person, to fulfill corporate legal requirements and for other business as determined by the Executive. Between meetings of the full General Council, an Executive serves to deal with any urgent and emergent matters, although it is possible for the full body of the General Council to be recalled for special or specific purposes.
 
The General Council is responsible for 
 setting a budget for the church
 oversight of regional councils
 dealing with proposals received from regional councils and members of General Council
 appeals of decisions of the Board of Vocation, decisions from formal hearings held by communities of faith or regional councils
 theological schools related to the United Church
 human resource policies within the church
 the church's archives
 
The General Council Office consists of the Moderator, the General Secretary and other support staff to the General Council, as well as members of the four permanent committees of the General Council, seven major working units and various other committees and task groups. The General Council Office is under the complete direction of the larger General Council and has a mandate to carry out the work which is given to them by the General Council.

Regional Councils

Administrative structure of General Council

Previous model of governance (1925-2018)
From 1925 to 2018, the church used a four-court model of governance, consisting of pastoral charges; presbyteries; conferences and the General Council.

 Pastoral charges referred to one or more congregations or preaching points.
 These were gathered into 88 regional presbyteries, 2 districts and one synod that covered all parts of Canada and Bermuda. The number of pastoral charges and presbyteries varied over time; in 2017, there were approximately 3000 pastoral charges gathered into 91 presbyteries.  
 Presbyteries were gathered into thirteen Conferences, which were regional. The exception to the regional model was the All Native Circle Conference, representing congregations that identified with Aboriginal groups across Canada.

References

United Church of Canada
Presbyteries and classes
Church organization